The Military ranks of Barbados are the military insignia used by the Barbados Defence Force.

Commissioned officer ranks 
The rank insignia of commissioned officers.

Other ranks 
The rank insignia of non-commissioned officers and enlisted personnel.

Historical ranks 
Other ranks

References

External links 
 
 

Barbados and the Commonwealth of Nations
Barbados
Military of Barbados